Tim Hecker is a Canadian electronic musician, producer, composer, and sound artist. His work, spanning atmospheric ambient albums such as Harmony in Ultraviolet (2006), Ravedeath, 1972 (2011) and Virgins (2013), has been widely critically acclaimed. He has released nine albums and a number of EPs in addition to a number of film scores and collaborations with artists such as Arca, Ben Frost, Jóhann Jóhannsson, Daniel Lopatin, and Aidan Baker.

Biography 

Born in Vancouver, British Columbia, Hecker is the son of two art teachers. During his high school years, he played in rock bands with friends, before acquiring a sampler and working on solo material. He moved to Montreal, Quebec in 1998 to study at Concordia University and explore his artistic interests further. He initially performed internationally as a DJ and techno producer under the name Jetone, releasing three albums under the moniker. By 2001 he became disenchanted with the musical direction of the Jetone project. In 2001, Hecker released the album Haunt Me, Haunt Me Do It Again, under his own name through the label Alien8. He followed with Radio Amor (2003) and Mirages (2004).

In 2006 he moved to Kranky where he released his fourth album Harmony in Ultraviolet. He subsequently incorporated the use of pipe organ sounds which were digitally processed and distorted. The album was called the 9th best ambient album of all time by Pitchfork. For the album Ravedeath, 1972, Hecker traveled to Iceland where together with Ben Frost, he recorded parts in a church. Ravedeath, 1972 was awarded the Juno Award for Electronic Album of the Year. In November 2010, Alien8 re-released Hecker's debut album on vinyl. Live performances contain improvisations by processing organ sounds that are manipulated, with great fluctuations in volume.

In 2012, Hecker collaborated with Daniel Lopatin (who also records as Oneohtrix Point Never) on an improvisatory project which became Instrumental Tourist (2012). Following 2013's Virgins, Hecker convened once again in Reykjavik, Iceland for sessions across 2014 and 2015, to create what would become Love Streams. Collaborators include Ben Frost, Johann Johannsson, Kara-Lis Coverdale and Grimur Helgason, whilst the 15th century choral works by Josquin des Prez birthed the foundations of the album. In February 2016, it was announced that Hecker had joined 4AD while Love Streams (2016) was released in April of that year. Hecker admits to thinking about ideas like "liturgical aesthetics after Yeezus" and the "transcendental voice in the age of auto-tune" during its creation.

In addition to touring with Godspeed You! Black Emperor and Sigur Rós and recording with the likes of Fly Pan Am, Hecker has also collaborated with the likes of Arca and Aidan Baker. He has also contributed remixes to other artists, including Ellen Allien, John Cale, Isis, and Interpol.

Personal life 
Hecker pursued a professional career outside music and worked as a political analyst for the Canadian Government in the early 2000s. After leaving his employment in 2006 he enrolled at McGill University to study for a PhD, with a thesis on urban noise that was published in 2014. He has also worked there as a lecturer in sound culture in the Art History and Communications department.

Discography

Tim Hecker

Albums 
Haunt Me, Haunt Me Do It Again (2001)
Radio Amor (2003)
Mirages (2004)
Harmony in Ultraviolet (2006)
An Imaginary Country (2009)
Ravedeath, 1972 (2011)
 Virgins (2013)
 Love Streams (2016)
 Konoyo (2018)
 Anoyo (2019)
 The North Water (Original Score) (2021)
 Infinity Pool (Original Motion Picture Soundtrack) (2023)
 No Highs (2023)

EPs and other 
Trade Winds, White Noise (2002)
My Love Is Rotten to the Core (2002)
Radio Marti / Radio Havana (2004)
Mort Aux Vaches (2005)
Pareidolia (2006)
Norberg (2007)
Atlas (2007)
Apondalifa (2010)
Dropped Pianos (2011)

Collaborations 
Random_Inc Meets Tim Hecker in Musrara with Random_Inc (2002)
Fantasma Parastasie with Aidan Baker (Nadja) (2008)
Archer on the Beach with Dan Bejar (Destroyer) (2010)
Instrumental Tourist with Daniel Lopatin (Oneohtrix Point Never) (2012)
Qalaq with Jerusalem In My Heart (2021)

As Jetone 
Autumnumonia (2000)
Ultramarin (2001)
Sundown (2006)

Credits 
Mitchell Akiyama – 'Temporary Music' (2002)
Désormais – 'Climate Variations' (2002)
Ghislain Poirier – 'Sous Le Manguier' (2002)
Tennis – 'Self-Heal Mishap' (Undertaker Mix) (2003)
Isis – 'Carry' (2004)
Isis – 'Carry' (Tim Hecker Remix Second Version) (2004)
Ris Paul Ric – 'Purple Blaze' (2005)
TV Pow – 'Whiteout' (2005)
Ensemble – 'Disown, Delete' (2006)
Lesbians On Ecstasy – 'We Know You Know' (2007)
Colin Stetson – 'Time Is Advancing With Fitful Irregularity White Pulse Mix' (2009)
Bell Orchestre – 'Water / Light / Shifts' (Remix) (2009)
Genghis Tron – 'Board Up The House' (Tim Hecker Remix) (2009)
Ellen Allien – 'Sun The Rain' (Tim Hecker Remix) (2011)
John Cale – Suffocation Raga For John Cale (Tim Hecker Transition) (2012)
Mogwai – 'Rano Pano' (Tim Hecker Remix) (2012)
Ellen Allien – 'Sun The Rain' (Tim Hecker Rmx) (2013)
The Field – 'No. No...' (Tim Hecker Mix) (2014)
Hundred Waters – 'Down From The Rafters' (Tim Hecker Remix) (2014)
Ben Frost –  'Aurora' (2014)
Dorian Concept – 'The Sky Opposite' (Tim Hecker Remix) (2015)
Interpol – Twice As Hard (Remixed By Tim Hecker) (2016)
Sarah Neufeld – 'The Ridge' (2016)
Michael Gordon, Mantra Percussion – Timber (Tim Hecker Remix) (2016)
Ben Lukas Boysen – 'Nocturne 4' (Tim Hecker Remix) (2017)
Chitose Hajime – '豊年節' (Tim Hecker Remix) (2019)
Arca – 'Cayó' (2022)

Art 
Hecker occasionally makes sound installations and has collaborated with visual artists such as Stan Douglas and Charles Stankievech.

Hecker, along with other musicians Ben Frost and Steve Goodman (Kode9) and artists Piotr Jakubowicz, Marcel Weber (MFO) and Manuel Sepulveda (Optigram), provided music for Unsound Festival's sensory installation, Ephemera.

Hecker composed the score for Damien Jalet's performance piece Planet [wanderer].

Film 
Hecker composed the score for 2016's The Free World, selected to be shown in the U.S. Dramatic Competition section at the 2016 Sundance Film Festival. He composed the score for BBC Two drama series The North Water directed by Andrew Haigh and based on Ian McGuire's novel of the same name.

Hecker also composed the score for the Austrian drama and horror film Luzifer, which won the Best Actor Award for Franz Rogowski at Fantastic Fest in 2021 and Best Actress Award for Susanne Jensen and Best Actor Award for Franz Rogowski at the 2021 Sitges Film Festival.

Hecker composed the score for Infinity Pool, the 2023 film by Canadian director Brandon Cronenberg, starring Alexander Skarsgård and Mia Goth, which premiered at the Sundance Film Festival.

See also 
List of ambient music artists

References

Further reading 
Bergmann, Brett. "Global Movement, Local Detail: The Music of Tim Hecker." eContact! 11.2 – Figures canadiennes (2) / Canadian Figures (2) (July 2009). Montréal: CEC.
Hecker, Tim. "Guest List Top 10."  Pitchfork. October 27, 2006.
Richardson, Mark. "Tim Hecker: Harmony in Ultraviolet." Pitchfork. CD Review. October 16, 2006.

External links 

Discography at Discogs

Interviews 
McDermott, Emily. "Tim Hecker’s Peace of Mind" Interview Magazine, May 19, 2016.
Kretowicz, Steph. "“I am lost with infinite choices”: Tim Hecker on the information overload of his new album Love Streams" FACT Magazine, 31 March 2016.
Burns, Todd. "Tim Hecker" Red Bull Music Academy, October 19, 2016.
Gottsegen, Will. "Tim Hecker 'Anoyo' Interview", SPIN, May 31, 2019.

Living people
Musicians from Montreal
Musicians from Vancouver
Ambient musicians
Canadian electronic musicians
Noise musicians
Alien8 Recordings artists
Paper Bag Records artists
1974 births
Juno Award for Electronic Album of the Year winners